The straight-tusked elephant (Palaeoloxodon antiquus) is an extinct species of elephant that inhabited Europe and Western Asia during the Middle and Late Pleistocene (781,000–30,000 years Before Present). The straight-tusked elephant probably lived in small herds, flourishing in interglacial periods, when its range would extend as far north as Great Britain. Isolated tusks are often found while partial or whole skeletons are rare, and there is evidence of scavenging or predation by early humans, including Neanderthals. It is the ancestral species of most dwarf elephants that inhabited islands in the Mediterranean.

Description 

Like other members of Palaeoloxodon, P. antiquus possesses a well developed parieto-occipital crest at the top of the cranium that anchored the splenius as well as possibly the rhomboid muscles to support the large head, the largest proportionally and in absolute size among proboscideans. Two morphs of P. antiquus were previously suggested to exist in Europe on the basis of parieto-occipital crest variation, one more similar to P. namadicus, but these were shown to be the result of ontogenetic variation and taphonomic distortion. P. antiquus can be distinguished from the Indian P. namadicus based on its less stout cranium and more robust limb bones. The forelimbs of P. antiquus, particuarly the humerus and scapular, are proportionally longer than those of African bush elephants. The head represents the highest point of the animal, with the back being sloped, with the most of the spines of the back vertebrae being long. The body (including the pelvis) was broad relative to extant elephants. The tail was shorter than that of extant elephants, but longer than that of the woolly mammoth. The tusks are very long relative to body size and vary from straight to slightly curved. Although not preserved, the body was probably only sparsely covered in hair, similar to extant elephants, and probably had large ears.

As with modern elephants, the species was sexually dimorphic, with males being substantially larger than females. P. antiquus was on average considerably larger than any living elephant.

Taxonomy
The species was first named in 1847 by Hugh Falconer and Proby Cautley for remains found in East Sussex as Elephas antiquus. The genus Palaeoloxodon was first named in 1924 by Hikoshichiro Matsumoto as a subgenus of Loxodonta, and E. antiquus subsequently assigned to the genus. Some experts regarded the larger Asian species Palaeoloxodon namadicus as a variant or subspecies, but they are now considered distinct. Historically, the genus Palaeoloxodon has at times been regarded as a subgenus of Elephas, but a 2007 study of hyoid characteristics amongst living and fossil elephants has largely led to an abandonment of this hypothesis. In 2016, a Mitochondrial DNA sequence analysis of P. antiquus suggested that its closest extant relative was the African forest elephant (L. cyclotis). The paper argues that P. antiquus is closer to L. cyclotis than L. cyclotis is to the African bush elephant, L. africana, thus invalidating the genus Loxodonta as currently recognized. A subsequent study published by Palkopoulou et al. (2018) based on the nuclear genome indicated a more complicated relationship between straight-tusked elephants and other species of elephants; according to this study, the biggest genetic contribution to straight-tusked elephants comes a lineage of elephants that was most closely related but  basal to the common ancestor of forest and bush elephants (~60% of total genomic contribution), which hybridized with members of the lineage related to extant African forest elephants (>30%) and to a lesser extent with mammoths (~5%). This hybridisation likely occurred in Africa, prior to migration of Palaeoloxodon into Eurasia.

Evolution 
P. antiquus is believed to derive from the African P. recki. P. antiquus first appears during the early Middle Pleistocene, around 0.8–0.6 Ma, appearing around 780 kya in Italy; its earliest known appearance in northern Europe is in Suffolk around 600 kya. Its arrival coincided with the replacement of Mammuthus meridionalis by Mammuthus trogontherii. There appears to be no overlap between M. meridionalis and P. antiquus, which suggests that the latter might have outcompeted the former. During P. antiquus's hundreds of thousands of years of existence, its morphology remained relatively static, unlike European mammoth populations.

Behaviour 
Straight-tusked elephants probably lived in small herds of about 5 to 15 individuals. Like its recent relatives, the straight-tusked elephant would have been heavily dependent on fresh water, which greatly influenced its migration. Dental microwear studies suggest that the diet of P. antiquus was highly variable according to the local conditions, ranging from almost completely grazing to nearly totally browsing, though microwear only reflects the diet in the last few days or weeks before death, so this may be reflecting seasonal dietary variation. Mesowear suggests a browsing predominant mixed feeding diet, with clear niche separation from the more grazing dominated diet of the sympatric Mammuthus trogontherii.

Range
They preferred warm conditions and flourished in the interglacial periods, expanding their range from Southern Europe as far North as Great Britain during the warmer interglacials, while permanently residing in Mediterranean Europe during glacial periods. The straight-tusked elephant became extinct in Britain near the beginning of the Weichselian glaciation, about 115,000 years ago. P. antiquus likely survived until around 28,000 years ago in the southern Iberian Peninsula, based on footprints.

Excavations 

Finds of isolated tusks are relatively common in Great Britain. For example, a tusk of this elephant was found during the construction of the Swan Valley Community School in Swanscombe, Kent. However, finds of whole or partial skeletons of this elephant are very rare.

Skeleton finds in Britain are known from only a few sites. Two sites were found in the Lower Thames basin, one at Upnor, Kent and one at Aveley, Essex. Paleontological and archaeological excavations in advance of High Speed 1 revealed the 400,000-year-old skeleton of a straight-tusked elephant in the Ebbsfleet Valley, near Swanscombe. It was lying at the edge of what would once have been a small lake. Flint tools lay scattered around, suggesting the elephant had been cut up by a group of the early humans around at the time, likely Homo heidelbergensis.

On the European mainland, many remains of the straight-tusked elephant have been found. In addition to skeletons, some sites contained additional archaeological material, as in the Ebbsfleet site. In Greece, three partial skeletons have been recovered from the province of West Macedonia, and a Palaeoloxodon antiquus butchering site has been excavated near Megalopolis, in the Peloponnese.

Straight-tusked elephant remains have been found with flint tools at a number of other sites, such as Torralba and Aridos in Spain, Notarchirico in Italy, and Gröbern and Ehringsdorf in Germany.

A Palaeolithic scratched figure of an elephant head in the Vermelhosa area, Portugal, near the Côa Valley Park, is reported to be the depiction of an Palaeoloxodon antiquus. The Iberian peninsula may have served as the last European refuge of the straight-tusked elephant. According to João Luís Cardoso, the species survived until 30,000 years BP in Portugal.

Elephants and early humans
Both early human beings and the straight-tusked elephant reached the European continent in the late Early Pleistocene. Sites where early humans and the straight-tusked elephant appear together have been frequently documented. One of the earliest finds is in an approximately 600,000-year-old site near Heidelberg, the location of the early human jawbone dubbed Mauer 1. Fossils were also found washed up in a course of the Neckar river. Isernia la Pineta in Italy is likely to be the same age or slightly younger. Remains of lower jaws are well documented in these three locations, alongside stone artefacts and numerous bones of rhinos, wild cattle, hippos and horses. Since the remains of the trunks do not show human markings, extinction by natural causes can not be ruled out.

The clearest proof to date that this animal was among the prey of early humans was provided in 1948 in Lehringen, Germany, near the Aller river. A skeleton of a straight-tusked elephant was found with a yew spear between the ribs, and lithic artifacts around the head. The find dates to the Eemian interglacial period. A similar find of a carcass exploited by humans from the same time period was found in 1987 in the Gröbern strip mine in Saxony-Anhalt. There were over 20 flint artifacts found, but there was no evidence of a hunting weapon. A second elephant skeleton found in Gröbern the same year proved to be free of any markings of human use.

Remains have also been recovered from another Eemian site, the former lake basin Neumark-Nord 1 on the northeast edge of the Geisel valley. Over 1,350 bone finds from straight-tusked elephants have been found from the basin since 1985, including some skeletons that were almost completely preserved. These remains belonged to about 70 individuals. They were found along with other animals such as rhinoceros (Stephanorhinus spp.), aurochs, horse, red deer and fallow deer. A large amount of old or sick elephants died there. None of the animals showed any traces of deliberate killing by early humans; however, flint artifacts also occurred, including one containing an oak bark extract that was apparently used for tanning.

Various archaeologists in Germany have dealt with the question of elephant hunting in the Paleolithic. Thorsten Uthmeier from FAU Erlangen-Nürnberg thinks regular elephant hunts are unlikely. With the assumed clan size of five to ten people and a shelf life of 30 days for meat, only animals with a weight of up to one ton, such as cattle, deer or horses, would be considered as game. Elephants would provide up to ten times more meat than the group could consume over the period. However, elephants are still hunted with spears by pygmies in the central African rainforest. Michael Baales from the Ruhr University considers the role of elephants to be important at some European sites, even if, despite the presence of cut marks, it cannot be clearly decided whether the animals were hunted or dead animals were eviscerated. After examining elephant remains, Sabine Gaudzinski-Windheuser from Johannes Gutenberg University. Mainz came to the conclusion that Stone Age material can prove the presence of humans in the vicinity of the sites. Nicholas J. Conard from the Eberhard Karls, University of Tübingen considers the role of elephants in the Paleolithic economy to be elusive.

In 2021 it was found that 400,000 years ago at Castel di Guido, Italy, a large number of bone tools, made from elephant bone were created. The tools are more sophisticated than tools found at other sites dating from the same period. They appear to have been made using production line assembly. Paola Villa, a University of Colorado Boulder archaeologist, suspects the tools were made by early Neanderthals. Techniques used to make the tools don't appear to have been used at other sites for another 100,000 years.

A 2023 study found that Neanderthals hunted the older males, large specimens likely to have led solitary lives, in disproportionate numbers.

Dwarfed descendants 

Elephants that presumably evolved from the straight-tusked elephant are described from many Mediterranean islands, where they evolved into dwarfed elephants. The responsible factors for the dwarfing of island mammals are thought to be the reduction in food availability, predation and competition.

References

Further reading

External links 

 TRACCE Online Rack Art Bulletin paper about an elephant head Palaeolithic depiction in Portugal

Palaeoloxodon
Pleistocene proboscideans
Pleistocene species
Pleistocene mammals of Europe
Pleistocene mammals of Asia
Fossil taxa described in 1847